CS Link was a satellite service that offers Czech and Slovak TV and radio stations to residents of Czech Republic and Slovakia.

CS Link stopped offering pay TV at the end of November 2012 following the acquisition by the Luxembourg media group M7 Group (Canal+ Luxembourg S.a.r.l.). M7 Group (Canal+ Luxembourg S.a.r.l.) is part of Canal+/Vivendi since September 2019.

The original package included digital channels received without subscription (free-to-view) including HD channels and pay-TV channels. CS Link has about 650,000 customers.

See also
Astra 3A
Astra 23.5°E
SES
Astra
HDTV
Skylink (TV platform)

References

External links
CS Link website
SES guide to receiving Astra satellites
SES guide to channels broadcasting on Astra satellites
HDTV on Astra satellites

Telecommunications companies of the Czech Republic
Direct broadcast satellite services
Companies based in Prague
Telecommunications companies established in 2006
Czech brands
Television stations in the Czech Republic
Television in Slovakia